Andrew Comyn "Sandy" Irvine (8 April 1902 – 8 June 1924) was an English mountaineer who took part in the 1924 British Everest Expedition, the third British expedition to the world's highest (8,848 m) mountain, Mount Everest.

While attempting the first ascent of Mount Everest, he and his climbing partner George Mallory disappeared somewhere high on the mountain's northeast ridge and died. The pair were last sighted only a few hundred metres from the summit, and it is unknown whether the pair reached the summit before they perished. Mallory's body was found in 1999, but Irvine's body and portable camera have never been found.

Early life
Irvine was born in Birkenhead, Merseyside, one of six children of historian William Fergusson Irvine (1869–1962) and Lilian Davies-Colley (1870–1950). His father's family had Scottish and Welsh roots, while his mother was from an old Cheshire family. He was a cousin of journalist and writer Lyn Irvine, and also of pioneering female surgeon Eleanor Davies Colley and of political activist Harriet Shaw Weaver.

He was educated at Birkenhead School and Shrewsbury School, where he demonstrated a natural engineering acumen, able to improvise fixes or improvements to almost anything mechanical. During the First World War, he created a small stir at the War Office by sending them a design for a synchronisation gear to allow a machine gun to fire from a propeller-driven aeroplane through the propeller without damaging its blades, and also a design for a gyroscopic stabiliser for aircraft.

He was also a keen sportsman and particularly excelled at rowing. His prodigious ability as a rower made him a star of the 1919 'Peace Regatta' at Henley with the Royal Shrewsbury School Boat Club, and propelled him to Merton College, Oxford, to study engineering.  At Oxford, he joined the Oxford University Mountaineering Club, and was also a member of the Oxford crew for the Oxford and Cambridge Boat Race in 1922 and a member of the winning crew in 1923, the only time Oxford won between 1913 and 1937.

He had an affair with a former chorus girl named Marjory Agnes Standish Summers (née Thompson). Marjory was married to the steel magnate Henry Hall Summers and was 33 years younger than him. Summers was one of the sons of founder John Summers, of John Summers & Sons, a steel company. While Irvine was on Everest, Henry began divorce proceedings against Marjory.

Everest expedition

In 1923, Irvine took part in the Merton College Arctic Expedition to Spitsbergen, where he excelled on every front. The expedition's leader, Noel Odell, and he discovered that they had met before, in 1919 on Foel Grach, a 3,000-foot-high Welsh mountain, when Irvine had ridden his motorcycle to the top and surprised Odell and his wife Mona, who had climbed it on foot. Subsequently, on Odell's recommendation, Irvine was invited to join the forthcoming third British Mount Everest expedition on the grounds that he might be the "superman" that the expedition felt it needed. He was at the time still a 21-year-old undergraduate student.

Irvine set sail for the Himalaya from Liverpool on board the SS California on 29 February 1924, along with three other members of the expedition, including George Mallory. Mallory later wrote home to his wife that Irvine "could be relied on for anything except perhaps conversation".

During the expedition, he made major and crucial innovations to the expedition's professionally designed oxygen sets, radically improving their functionality, lightness, and strength. He also maintained the expedition's cameras, camp beds, primus stoves, and many other devices. He was universally popular, and respected by his older colleagues for his ingenuity, companionability, and unstinting hard work.

The expedition made two unsuccessful attempts on the summit in early June, and time remained for one more before the heavy snowfall that came with the summer monsoon would make climbing too dangerous. This last chance fell to the expedition's most experienced climber, George Mallory. To the surprise of other expedition members, Mallory chose the 22-year-old inexperienced Irvine above the older, more seasoned climber, Noel Odell. Irvine's proficiency with the oxygen equipment was obviously a major factor in Mallory's decision, but  some debate has occurred ever since about the precise reasons for his choice.

What time they departed on 8 June is unknown, but circumstantial evidence suggests that they did not have the smooth, early start that Mallory had hoped for.

Odell, who was acting in a supporting role, reported seeing them at 12:50 pm—much later than expected—ascending what he believed was the Second Step of the northeast ridge and "going strongly for the top", although in the years that followed, exactly which of the Three Steps Odell had sighted the pair climbing became extremely controversial.

Whether they reached the summit has never been established. They never returned to their camp and died somewhere high on the mountain. The discovery of Mallory's body in 1999, with its severe rope jerk injury about his waist, suggests the two were roped when they fell. Irvine's body has never been discovered.

Traces on the ridge

Discovery of the ice axe
It was found lying loose on brown 'boiler-plate' slabs of rock, which though not particularly steep, were smooth and in places had a covering of loose pebbles. The Swiss manufacturer's name matched those of a number supplied to the 1924 expedition, and since only Mallory and Irvine had climbed that high along the ridge route, it must have belonged to one of them.

Hugh Ruttledge, leader of the 1933 expedition, speculated that the ice axe marked the scene of a fall, during which it was either accidentally dropped or that its owner put it down, possibly to have both hands free to hold the rope.
Noel Odell, the last man to see Mallory and Irvine on their ascent in 1924, offered a more benign explanation: that the ice axe had merely been placed there on the ascent to be collected on the way back in view of the fact that the climbing ahead was almost entirely on rock under the prevailing conditions.

In 1963, a characteristic triple nick mark on a military swagger stick, found among Andrew Irvine's possessions, was found to match a similar mark on the ice axe's shaft, suggesting the axe belonged to Irvine.

Discovery of the oxygen cylinder
Since only Mallory and Irvine had been on the northeast ridge in 1924, this oxygen cylinder marked the minimum altitude they must have reached on their final climb. The oxygen cylinder was recovered in May 1999.

Discovery of Mallory
The remains of a rope still encircled his waist, which exhibited serious haemorrhaging, indicative of a strong rope-jerk injury, and strongly suggesting that at some point either Mallory or Irvine fell while they were still roped together. Mallory was found with relatively few major injuries, compared to a number of modern climbers who had fallen the full distance from the northeast ridge and who were found to have sustained numerous fractures, suggesting he had survived this initial fall, and suffered a further accident. A golf ball-sized puncture wound in his forehead seemed to be the likely cause of death, and could have been inflicted by an ice axe. It has subsequently been speculated that an injured Mallory was descending in a self-arrest "glissade", sliding down the slope while dragging his ice axe in the snow to control the speed of his descent, and that his ice axe may have struck a rock and bounced off, striking him fatally.

A search of the body revealed two pieces of circumstantial evidence that suggested that Mallory might have reached the summit:

Firstly, Mallory's daughter had always said that Mallory carried a photograph of his wife on his person with the intention of leaving it on the summit when he reached it, and no such photograph was found on the body. Given the excellent state of preservation of the body and the artifacts recovered from it, the absence of the photograph suggests that he may have reached the summit and deposited it there.
 Secondly, Mallory's snow goggles were in his pocket when the body was found, indicating that he died at night. This implies that he and Irvine had made a push for the summit and were descending very late in the day. Given their known departure time and movements, had they not made the summit, it is unlikely that they would have still been out by nightfall.

The search revealed no trace of the two Vest Pocket Kodak cameras that Irvine's diaries said he and Mallory were carrying, leading to speculation that one or more of the cameras might yet be found with Irvine's body. Experts from Kodak have said that there is a good chance that the cameras' black-and-white film could be developed to produce "printable images", due to its chemical nature and its likely preservation in subzero temperatures. Such images could illuminate the fate of Mallory and Irvine.

Possible sightings

Sighting by Wang Hong-bao
Wang knew the man was British, he said, by the old-fashioned clothing, rotted and disintegrating at the touch, and poked his finger into his cheek to indicate an injury.
However, before more information could be obtained, Wang was killed in an avalanche the following day.

Further confirmation of this sighting was provided by a 1986 conversation that American Everest historian Tom Holzel had with Zhang Junyan, Wang's tent-mate from the 1975 expedition. Zhang said Wang returned from a 20-minute excursion and described finding "a foreign mountaineer" at 8,100 meters.
Since no other European climber was known to have died at that elevation on the north side of Everest, it was almost certain that the body was either Mallory or Irvine.

Wang's 1975 sighting was the key to the discovery of Mallory's body 24 years later in the same general area, although his reported description of the body he found—"hole in cheek"—is not consistent with the condition and posture of Mallory's body, which was face down, his head almost completely buried in scree, and with a golfball-sized puncture wound on his forehead. One possibility is that Wang actually saw Irvine. Another is that Wang discovered Mallory face up and turned his body over to effect a simple burial.

In 2001, the second Mallory and Irvine Research Expedition discovered Wang's 1975 campsite location and made an extensive search of its surroundings, and found that Mallory's remained the only body in the vicinity.

Sighting by Xu Jing
In 2001, Eric Simonson, leader of the 1999 Mallory and Irvine Expedition, and German researcher Jochen Hemmleb, who inspired it, travelled to Beijing to interview some of the remaining survivors of the 1960 Chinese Everest expedition, which had been the first expedition back to the north side since the British attempts of the 1920s and 1930s.

During their meeting, the deputy leader of the expedition, Xu Jing, said that on his descent from the First Step, he spotted a dead climber lying on his back, feet facing uphill, in a hollow or slot in the rock. Since no one other than Mallory and Irvine had ever been lost on the north side of Everest before 1960, and Mallory had been found much lower down, it was almost a certainty that Xu had discovered Irvine. However, the sighting was brief, and Xu was in desperate straits during the descent, and while he clearly remembered seeing the body, he was unclear about where it was.

Sighting by Wang Fu-chou
A more contemporary account, not dulled by the passage of 40 years, has subsequently surfaced. In 1965, a member of the 1960 Chinese expedition, Wang Fu-chou, gave a lecture in the headquarters of the USSR Geographical Society in Leningrad. Asked how he could be sure the dead man was European, the Chinese climber replied simply, "He was wearing braces".

Recent searches
In 2010, a team informally dubbed the Andrew Irvine Search Committee and led by Holzel searched for Irvine in a computer-assembled montage of aerial photographs taken in 1984 by Brad Washburn and the National Geographic Society.

A new expedition organised by Holzel was due to explore the upper slopes of Everest in December 2011, presumably with a view to determining the nature of this possible object. By conducting the expedition in winter, it was hoped that there would be much less snow on the upper slopes, increasing the chances of finding Irvine, as well as the camera that it is hoped will be with him.

In 2019, Mark Synott led a party that investigated the 'crevice' identified by Holzel as the potential resting place of Irvine, but discovered that it was merely an optical illusion. Synott later reported on the possibility that the 1975 Chinese expedition may have found both Irvine and the camera.

Comments by friends of Irvine
 Upon hearing of Irvine and Mallory's disappearance, a family friend wrote: "One cannot imagine Sandy content to float placidly in some quiet back-water, he was the sort that must struggle against the current and, if need be, go down foaming in full body over the precipice".
 Arnold Lunn, one of Irvine's friends, wrote: "Irvine did not live long, but he lived well. Into his short life he crowded an overflowing measure of activity which found its climax in his last wonderful year, a year during which he rowed in the winning Oxford boat, explored Spitsbergen, fell in love with skiing, and – perhaps – conquered Everest. The English love rather to live well than to live long".

See also
 List of Oxford University Boat Race crews
 List of people who died climbing Mount Everest
 List of people who disappeared
 The Wildest Dream

References
 
 
 
 
 
Footnotes

External links
 Altitude Everest Expedition 2007, retracing Mallory and Irvine's last steps on Everest.
 AC Irvine Travel Fund
 Everest News on Sandy Irvine
 Mallory and Irvine Memorials

1902 births
1920s missing person cases
1924 deaths
Alumni of Merton College, Oxford
English explorers
English mountain climbers
English people of Scottish descent
Lost explorers
Missing person cases in China
Mountaineering deaths on Mount Everest
People educated at Birkenhead School
People educated at Shrewsbury School
People from Birkenhead